Bernard de Girard Haillan (c.1535–1610) was a French historian.

Biography
He was born in Bordeaux and occupied a number of political offices before Charles IX appointed him historiographer of France. He was confirmed as historiographer by Henry III, who liked him so well, despite his vanity and selfishness, that he made him genealogist of the Order of the Holy Ghost, and gave him a pension of 1200 crowns.

Works
He is considered a follower of Étienne Pasquier, so much so that complaints Pasquier made of plagiarism may have been meant for him. Early works were État et Succès des affaires de France (1570) and Promesse et Dessein de l'histoire de France (1572). He is best known for L'histoire générale des rois de France jusqu'à Charles VII inclusivement (History of the kings of France up to Charles VII, 1576).

References

References 

Attribution

Writers from Bordeaux
1535 births
1610 deaths
16th-century French historians
French male non-fiction writers